Nsawam-Adoagyire Municipal District is one of the thirty-three districts in Eastern Region, Ghana. Originally created as an ordinary district assembly in 1988 when it was known as the first Akuapim South District, which it was created from the former Akuapim District Council; until it was elevated to municipal district assembly status to become Akuapim South Municipal District, with Nsawam as its capital town. However on 6 February 2012, the northeast part of the district was split off to create a new Akuapim South District, with Aburi as its capital town; thus the remaining part has been renamed as Nsawam-Adoagyire Municipal District, with Nsawam as its capital town. The municipality is located in the southeast part of Eastern Region and has Nsawam as its capital town.

Geography
Nsawam-Adoagyire Municipal District lies in the southwestern part of the Eastern Region. It borders Suhum Municipal District in the northwest, and Akuapim North Municipal District in the northeast.

Topography
It has an undulating topography with two main ecological zones, the moist semi-deciduous forest and coastal savannah grassland. The district is dependent on the river Densu for water supply at the Nsawam-Adoagyire Municipal District water treatment plant.

List of settlements

Sources 
 
 Districts: Akuapim South Municipal District

References

Districts of the Eastern Region (Ghana)